SS Morris C. Feinstone was a Liberty ship built in the United States during World War II. She was named after Morris Feinstone, a Polish born wood-carver, master designer, and the executive secretary of the United Hebrew Trades union.

Construction
Morris C. Feinstone was laid down on 5 September 1944, under a Maritime Commission (MARCOM) contract, MC hull 2499, by the St. Johns River Shipbuilding Company, Jacksonville, Florida; she was sponsored by Mrs. Morris C. Feinstone, the widow of the namesake, and was launched on 10 October 1944.

History
She was allocated to the Black Diamond Steamship Company, on 22 October 1944. On 17 November 1947, she was laid up in the James River Reserve Fleet, Lee Hall, Virginia. On 3 August 1953, she was withdrawn from the fleet to be loaded with grain under the "Grain Program 1953", she returned loaded on 20 August 1953. On 10 June 1957, she was withdrawn to be unload, she returned on empty 20 June 1957. On 1 August 1958, she was withdrawn from the fleet to be loaded with grain under the "Grain Program 1958", she returned loaded on 15 August 1958. On 7 January 1960, she was withdrawn to be unload, she returned on empty 15 January 1960. On 24 October 1960, she was withdrawn from the fleet to be loaded with grain under the "Grain Program 1960", she returned loaded on 5 November 1960. On 11 April 1963, she was withdrawn to be unload, she returned on empty 19 April 1963. She was sold for scrapping, 10 April 1972, to Hierros Ardes, SA., for $67,500. She was removed from the fleet, 27 June 1972.

References

Bibliography

 
 
 
 

 

Liberty ships
Ships built in Jacksonville, Florida
1944 ships
James River Reserve Fleet
James River Reserve Fleet Grain Program